Danny Plotnick is an American independent filmmaker. In addition to making over 20 films, he has released three videotape compilations and a DVD compilation which have garnered international distribution, embarked on five national film tours, two European film tours and has taught numerous seminars on a variety of film topics.  Much of his work in the 1980s and 1990s was produced on Super 8 mm film.

Filmography

Films

Music Videos

Compilations

References

External links

Danny Plotnick videos at Vimeo. Archived from the original on 2014-05-13.

Further reading

Living people
Film directors from Michigan
Artists from Detroit
Year of birth missing (living people)